Convoy PQ 6 was the seventh of the Arctic convoys of World War II by which the Western Allies supplied material aid to the Soviet Union in its fight with Nazi Germany. The convoy sailed from Hvalfjörður, Iceland, on 8 December 1941 and arrived at Murmansk on 20 December 1941.

Ships
The convoy consisted of eight transport ships (1 Soviet, 4 British, 1 Norwegian and 2 Panamanian).

All ships arrived safely.

Ships
The following information is from the Arnold Hague Convoy Database.

References

 Richard Woodman, Arctic Convoys 1941-1945, 1994, 
 Convoy web

PQ 06